Fall Down may refer to:

 "Fall Down" (Jebediah song) (2002)
 "Fall Down" (Tantric song) (2008)
 "Fall Down" (Toad the Wet Sprocket song) (1994)
 "Fall Down" (will.i.am song), featuring Miley Cyrus (2013)
 “Fall Down (Spirit of Love)”, a 1985 gospel song by Tramaine Hawkins
 "Fall Down (Like the Rain)", a 1988 song by the Mighty Lemon Drops from the album World Without End

See also
Falling Down (disambiguation)